William Burton (November 26, 1875 – July 22, 1914) was an American golfer. He competed in the men's individual event at the 1904 Summer Olympics.

References

1875 births
1914 deaths
Amateur golfers
American male golfers
Olympic golfers of the United States
Golfers at the 1904 Summer Olympics
Sportspeople from Vicksburg, Mississippi